King's Legacy (foaled 1 September 2017) is a multiple Group 1 winning Australian thoroughbred racehorse.

Background
King's Legacy was the third highest priced lot sold at the 2019 Magic Millions Yearling Sale.  He was purchased by James Harron Bloodstock for $1.4 million.

Racing career

2019/20: two-year-old season

King's Legacy began his racing career in a mid-week maiden at Rosehill Gardens Racecourse finishing in third placing.   The colt then started at the odds of 5/1 in the B J McLachlan Plate at Eagle Farm Racecourse.  Under the guidance of jockey Kerrin McEvoy the horse won by a margin of half a length.

As a result of this win King's Legacy gained a start in the Magic Millions Classic for two-year-olds a fortnight later.   He finished in 5th placing.   After a break of two months, he next started in the Golden Slipper Stakes at the odds of 80/1 and was beaten some 7 lengths into 9th placing.  After the race jockey Damian Lane stated, "They were a little bit sharp for him but he ran well, he's looking for a little bit further.”

Two weeks later he contested the Group 1 Sires' Produce Stakes.   After settling in last position for jockey Hugh Bowman, the horse appreciated the extra 200 metres of the Sires' to win by half a length at the odds of 18/1. Trainer Peter Snowden stated after the race, "He was always going to be a horse that was going to get better at 1400 metres, it is exciting to get the group One with him because he is a very valuable colt now.”

After his success in the Sires', King’s Legacy became the 38th individual Group 1 winner for his sire Redoute's Choice who died 12 months previously.

After winning the Sires', King's Legacy was successful in his second Group 1 in winning the Champagne Stakes.

2020/21: three-year-old season

King's Legacy resumed on the 12 September 2020 when finishing last of 7 runners in The Run To The Rose. He showed much improvement at his next start in the Golden Rose when finishing 3rd behind Ole Kirk at odds of 20/1.

The horse was spelled after running unplaced in both the Caulfield Guineas and Cantala Stakes.  He was retired from racing after unplaced runs in the Hobartville Stakes and Randwick Guineas.

Stud career

In 2021 King's Legacy was added to the stallion roster of Coolmore Stud, where his initial service fee was set at A$33,000.

Pedigree

References 

Australian racehorses
Racehorses bred in Australia
Racehorses trained in Australia
2017 racehorse births